Peppermint Creek Theatre Company was established in Mason, Michigan. It is a theater company out of East Lansing, Michigan. The founder and co-Artistic Director is Chad Badgero.

Founded in 1995 and originally named the Peppermint Creek Players, PCTC performed one play a summer.  The company is named after the creek that runs near founder Chad Badgero's childhood home in Mason, MI.  As a fifth grader, Badgero was looking through old maps of Mason and found where his house would have been, and the creek was THEN called Peppermint Creek (it has since been changed to the name of the road it cuts through).  This stuck with Badgero, and when it came time to name the group, it seemed appropriate and personal. The first two productions were presented at Mount Hope Presbyterian Church, and then moved to the MSU Gardens Conservatory.  From 1995 to 2000, Peppermint Creek established itself as a new, fresh, and vital performing arts group that took chances and believed in the power of theatre.  When Mr. Badgero returned from a year in New York City, he brought with him the desire to completely establish PCTC as a non-profit organization with a full season of shows.

Peppermint Creek Theatre Company has performed at the Basement 414 and Creole Art Gallery, Lansing art galleries., Mount Hope Presbyterian Church, Woldumar Nature Center, MSU Auditorium Rm 49, MSU Greenhouses, and currently at the Miller Performing Arts Center.

References

http://www.lansingcitypulse.com/lansing/article-5657-delightfully-distracted.html

External links
 Peppermint Creek Theatre

Theatre companies in Michigan
Tourist attractions in Lansing, Michigan
Theatre in Michigan